James Jay Horning (24 August 1942 – 18 January 2013) was an American computer scientist and ACM Fellow.

Overview
Jim Horning received a PhD in computer science from Stanford University in 1969 for a thesis entitled A Study of Grammatical Inference. He was a founding member, and later chairman, of the Computer Systems Research Group at the University of Toronto, Canada, from 1969 until 1977. He was then a Research Fellow at the Xerox Palo Alto Research Center (PARC) from 1977 until 1984 and a founding member and senior consultant at DEC Systems Research Center (DEC/SRC) from  1984 until 1996. He was founder and director of STAR Lab from 1997 until 2001 at InterTrust Technologies Corp.
 
Peter G. Neumann reported on 22 January 2013 in the RISKS Digest, Volume 27, Issue 14, that Horning had died on 18 January 2013.

Horning's interests included programming languages, programming methodology, specification, formal methods, digital rights management and computer/network security. A major contribution was his involvement with the Larch approach to formal specification with John Guttag (MIT) et al.

Selected publications
A Compiler Generator (with William M. McKeeman and D. B. Wortman), Prentice Hall (1970). .

References

External links

Home page
Curriculum Vitae

1942 births
2013 deaths
Stanford University alumni
American computer scientists
Academic staff of the University of Toronto
Xerox people
Digital Equipment Corporation people
Fellows of the Association for Computing Machinery
Formal methods people